In quantum mechanics, the particle in a box model (also known as the infinite potential well or the infinite square well) describes a particle free to move in a small space surrounded by impenetrable barriers.  The model is mainly used as a hypothetical example to illustrate the differences between classical and quantum systems.  In classical systems, for example, a particle trapped inside a large box can move at any speed within the box and it is no more likely to be found at one position than another. However, when the well becomes very narrow (on the scale of a few nanometers), quantum effects become important. The particle may only occupy certain positive energy levels.  Likewise, it can never have zero energy, meaning that the particle can never "sit still".  Additionally, it is more likely to be found at certain positions than at others, depending on its energy level.  The particle may never be detected at certain positions, known as spatial nodes.

The particle in a box model is one of the very few problems in quantum mechanics which can be solved analytically, without approximations. Due to its simplicity, the model allows insight into quantum effects without the need for complicated mathematics.  It serves as a simple illustration of how energy quantizations (energy levels), which are found in more complicated quantum systems such as atoms and molecules, come about.  It is one of the first quantum mechanics problems taught in undergraduate physics courses, and it is commonly used as an approximation for more complicated quantum systems.

One-dimensional solution 

The simplest form of the particle in a box model considers a one-dimensional system.  Here, the particle may only move backwards and forwards along a straight line with impenetrable barriers at either end.
The walls of a one-dimensional box may be seen as regions of space with an infinitely large potential energy.  Conversely, the interior of the box has a constant, zero potential energy.  This means that no forces act upon the particle inside the box and it can move freely in that region.  However, infinitely large forces repel the particle if it touches the walls of the box, preventing it from escaping.  The potential energy in this model is given as

where L is the length of the box, xc is the location of the center of the box and x is the position of the particle within the box. Simple cases include the centered box (xc = 0) and the shifted box (xc = L/2) (pictured).

Position wave function 

In quantum mechanics, the wavefunction gives the most fundamental description of the behavior of a particle; the measurable properties of the particle (such as its position, momentum and energy) may all be derived from the wavefunction.
The wavefunction  can be found by solving the Schrödinger equation for the system

Inside the box, no forces act upon the particle, which means that the part of the wavefunction inside the box oscillates through space and time with the same form as a free particle:
The frequency of the oscillations through space and time is given by the wavenumber  and the angular frequency  respectively. These are both related to the total energy of the particle by the expression

which is known as the dispersion relation for a free particle. Here one must notice that now, since the particle is not entirely free but under the influence of a potential (the potential V described above), the energy of the particle given above is not the same thing as  where p is the momentum of the particle, and thus the wavenumber k above actually describes the energy states of the particle, not the momentum states (i.e. it turns out that the momentum of the particle is not given by ). In this sense, it is quite dangerous to call the number k a wavenumber, since it is not related to momentum like "wavenumber" usually is. The rationale for calling k the wavenumber is that it enumerates the number of crests that the wavefunction has inside the box, and in this sense it is a wavenumber. This discrepancy can be seen more clearly below, when we find out that the energy spectrum of the particle is discrete (only discrete values of energy are allowed) but the momentum spectrum is continuous (momentum can vary continuously) and in particular, the relation  for the energy and momentum of the particle does not hold.

The wavefunction must therefore vanish everywhere beyond the edges of the box. Also, the amplitude of the wavefunction may not "jump" abruptly from one point to the next. These two conditions are only satisfied by wavefunctions with the form

where

and

where n is a positive integer (1, 2, 3, 4, ...). For a shifted box (xc = L/2), the solution is particularly simple. The simplest solutions,  or  both yield the trivial wavefunction , which describes a particle that does not exist anywhere in the system. Here one sees that only a discrete set of energy values and wavenumbers k are allowed for the particle. Usually in quantum mechanics it is also demanded that the derivative of the wavefunction in addition to the wavefunction itself be continuous; here this demand would lead to the only solution being the constant zero function, which is not what we desire, so we give up this demand (as this system with infinite potential can be regarded as a nonphysical abstract limiting case, we can treat it as such and "bend the rules").

Finally, the unknown constant  may be found by normalizing the wavefunction so that the total probability density of finding the particle in the system is 1.

Mathematically,  (The particle must be somewhere)

It follows that 

Thus, A may be any complex number with absolute value ; these different values of A yield the same physical state, so A =  can be selected to simplify.

It is expected that the eigenvalues, i.e., the energy  of the box should be the same regardless of its position in space, but  changes. Notice that  represents a phase shift in the wave function. This phase shift has no effect when solving the Schrödinger equation, and therefore does not affect the eigenvalue.

If we set the origin of coordinates to the center of the box, we can rewrite the spacial part of the wave function succinctly as:

Momentum wave function 

The momentum wavefunction is proportional to the Fourier transform of the position wavefunction.

where sinc is the cardinal sine sinc function, . For the centered box, the solution is real and particularly simple, since the phase factor on the right reduces to unity.

It can be seen that the momentum spectrum in this wave packet is continuous, and one may conclude that for the energy state described by the wavenumber , the momentum can, when measured, also attain other values beyond .

Position and momentum probability distributions 

In classic physics, the particle can be detected anywhere in the box with equal probability.  In quantum mechanics, however, the probability density for finding a particle at a given position is derived from the wavefunction as   For the particle in a box, the probability density for finding the particle at a given position depends upon its state, and is given by

In quantum mechanics, the average, or expectation value of the position of a particle is given by

For the steady state particle in a box, it can be shown that the average position is always , regardless of the state of the particle.

The variance in the position is a measure of the uncertainty in position of the particle:

As with position, the probability density for finding the particle at a given momentum depends upon its state, and is given by

where, again, . The expectation value for the momentum is then calculated to be zero, and the variance in the momentum is calculated to be:

The uncertainties in position and momentum ( and ) are defined as being equal to the square root of their respective variances, so that:

This product increases with increasing n, having a minimum value for n=1. The value of this product for n=1 is about equal to 0.568  which obeys the Heisenberg uncertainty principle, which states that the product will be greater than or equal to 

Another measure of uncertainty in position is the information entropy of the probability distribution Hx:

where x0 is an arbitrary reference length.

Another measure of uncertainty in momentum is the information entropy of the probability distribution Hp:

where γ is Euler's constant. The quantum mechanical entropic uncertainty principle states that for 
 (nats)

For , the sum of the position and momentum entropies yields:
 (nats)

which satisfies the quantum entropic uncertainty principle.

Energy levels 

The energies which correspond with each of the permitted wavenumbers may be written as

The lowest possible energy for the particle (its zero-point energy) is found in state 1, which is given by

The particle, therefore, always has a positive energy.  This contrasts with classical systems, where the particle can have zero energy by resting motionlessly.  This can be explained in terms of the uncertainty principle, which states that the product of the uncertainties in the position and momentum of a particle is limited by

It can be shown that the uncertainty in the position of the particle is proportional to the width of the box. Thus, the uncertainty in momentum is roughly inversely proportional to the width of the box.

Higher-dimensional boxes

(Hyper)rectangular walls

Using a similar approach to that of the one-dimensional box, it can be shown that the wavefunctions and energies for a centered box are given respectively by

where the two-dimensional wavevector is given by

For a three dimensional box, the solutions are

where the three-dimensional wavevector is given by:

In general for an n-dimensional box, the solutions are

An interesting feature of the above solutions is that when two or more of the lengths are the same (e.g. ), there are multiple wavefunctions corresponding to the same total energy. This situation is called degeneracy and for the case where exactly two degenerate wavefunctions have the same energy that energy level is said to be doubly degenerate. Degeneracy results from symmetry in the system. For the above case two of the lengths are equal so the system is symmetric with respect to a 90° rotation.

More complicated wall shapes

The wavefunction for a quantum-mechanical particle in a box whose walls have arbitrary shape is given by the Helmholtz equation subject to the boundary condition that the wavefunction vanishes at the walls. These systems are studied in the field of quantum chaos for wall shapes whose corresponding dynamical billiard tables are non-integrable.

Applications 
Because of its mathematical simplicity, the particle in a box model is used to find approximate solutions for more complex physical systems in which a particle is trapped in a narrow region of low electric potential between two high potential barriers.  These quantum well systems are particularly important in optoelectronics, and are used in devices such as the quantum well laser, the quantum well infrared photodetector and the quantum-confined Stark effect modulator. It is also used to model a lattice in the Kronig-Penney model and for a finite metal with the free electron approximation.

Conjugated polyenes

Conjugated polyene systems can be modeled using particle in a box. The conjugated system of electrons can be modeled as a one dimensional box with length equal to the total bond distance from one terminus of the polyene to the other. In this case each pair of electrons in each π bond corresponds to their energy level. The energy difference between two energy levels, nf and ni is:

The difference between the ground state energy, n, and the first excited state, n+1, corresponds to the energy required to excite the system. This energy has a specific wavelength, and therefore color of light, related by:

A common example of this phenomenon is in β-carotene. β-carotene (C40H56) is a conjugated polyene with an orange color and a molecular length of approximately 3.8 nm (though its chain length is only approximately 2.4 nm). Due to β-carotene's high level of conjugation, electrons are dispersed throughout the length of the molecule, allowing one to model it as a one-dimensional particle in a box. β-carotene has 11 carbon-carbon double bonds in conjugation; each of those double bonds contains two π-electrons, therefore β-carotene has 22 π-electrons. With two electrons per energy level, β-carotene can be treated as a particle in a box at energy level n=11. Therefore, the minimum energy needed to excite an electron to the next energy level can be calculated, n=12, as follows (recalling that the mass of an electron is 9.109 × 10−31 kg):

Using the previous relation of wavelength to energy, recalling both Planck's constant h and the speed of light c:

This indicates that β-carotene primarily absorbs light in the infrared spectrum, therefore it would appear white to a human eye. However the observed wavelength is 450 nm, indicating that the particle in a box is not a perfect model for this system.

Quantum well laser 
The particle in a box model can be applied to quantum well lasers, which are laser diodes consisting of one semiconductor “well” material sandwiched between two other semiconductor layers of different material . Because the layers of this sandwich are very thin (the middle layer is typically about 100 Å thick), quantum confinement effects can be observed. The idea that quantum effects could be harnessed to create better laser diodes originated in the 1970s. The quantum well laser was patented in 1976 by R. Dingle and C. H. Henry.

Specifically, the quantum wells behavior can be represented by the particle in a finite well model. Two boundary conditions must be selected. The first is that the wave function must be continuous. Often, the second boundary condition is chosen to be the derivative of the wave function must be continuous across the boundary, but in the case of the quantum well the masses are different on either side of the boundary. The solution to the finite well particle in a box must be solved numerically, resulting in wave functions that are sine functions inside the quantum well and exponentially decaying functions in the barriers. This quantization of the energy levels of the electrons allows a quantum well laser to emit light more efficiently than conventional semiconductor lasers.

Due to their small size, quantum dots do not showcase the bulk properties of the specified semi-conductor but rather show quantised energy states. This effect is known as the quantum confinement and has led to numerous applications of quantum dots such as the quantum well laser.

Researchers at Princeton University have recently built a quantum well laser which is no bigger than a grain of rice. The laser is powered by a single electron which passes through two quantum dots; a double quantum dot. The electron moves from a state of higher energy, to a state of lower energy whilst emitting photons in the microwave region. These photons bounce off mirrors to create a beam of light; the laser.

The quantum well laser is heavily based on the interaction between light and electrons. This relationship is a key component in quantum mechanical theories which include the De Broglie Wavelength and Particle in a box. The double quantum dot allows scientists to gain full control over the movement of an electron which consequently results in the production of a laser beam.

Quantum dots 
Quantum dots are extremely small semiconductors (on the scale of nanometers). They display quantum confinement in that the electrons cannot escape the “dot”, thus allowing particle-in-a-box approximations to be used. Their behavior can be described by three-dimensional particle-in-a-box energy quantization equations.

The energy gap of a quantum dot is the energy gap between its valence and conduction bands. This energy gap  is equal to the  gap of the bulk material  plus the energy equation derived particle-in-a-box, which gives the energy for electrons and holes.

Hence, the energy gap of the quantum dot is inversely proportional to the square of the “length of the box,” i.e. the radius of the quantum dot.

Manipulation of the band gap allows for the absorption and emission of specific wavelengths of light, as energy is inversely proportional to wavelength. The smaller the quantum dot, the larger the band gap and thus the shorter the wavelength absorbed.

Different semiconducting materials are used to synthesize quantum dots of different sizes and therefore emit different wavelengths of light. Materials that normally emit light in the visible region are often used and their sizes are fine-tuned so that certain colors are emitted. Typical substances used to synthesize quantum dots are cadmium (Cd) and selenium (Se). For example, when the electrons of two nanometer CdSe quantum dots relax after excitation, blue light is emitted. Similarly, red light is emitted in four nanometer CdSe quantum dots.

Quantum dots have a variety of functions including but not limited to fluorescent dyes, transistors, LEDs, solar cells, and medical imaging via optical probes.

One function of quantum dots is their use in lymph node mapping, which is feasible due to their unique ability to emit light in the near infrared (NIR) region. Lymph node mapping allows surgeons to track if and where cancerous cells exist.

Quantum dots are useful for these functions due to their emission of brighter light, excitation by a wide variety of wavelengths, and higher resistance to light than other substances.

A more general model: particle in a box with a period potential 

A more general model is the particle in a box with a period potential model: The box's interior has a periodic potential, and the box contains periods of a positive integer number in each dimension. A periodic potential becomes a constant potential, and a Bloch wave becomes a plane wave when the period(s) involved goes zero. The periodic potential is more general than the constant potential; the Bloch wave is more general than the plane wave.
A recent new theory 

investigated this model based on the mathematical theory of periodic differential equations. 

 
The problem can be considered quantum confinement of Bloch waves, more general than the quantum confinement of plane waves discussed in previous sections. The new theory found that, in one-dimensional cases, the problem can be analytically solved. Moreover, in many essential and simple multi-dimensional cases, the problem can be analytically solved based on relevant mathematical theorems with the help of reasonings of physics intuitions. In the following, we only briefly describe some essential conclusions. Readers interested in mathematical reasonings and more relevant details are referred to original publications.

One-dimensional cases

We consider a one-dimensional box with periodic potential of finite
We are mainly interested in cases where the bulk energy bands have a band gap between two consecutive energy bands.

The new theory found that two different types of states exist in such a box with a periodic potential.
For each bulk energy band, there are  states in the finite crystal whose energies and properties 
depend on  but not  and map the energy band exactly. These states are the stationary Bloch states;
There is always one and only one state for each band gap, whose energy and properties depend on  but not . 
This state is either a band-edge state or a surface state in the band gap.

The very existence of such -dependent states is the fundamental distinction of the quantum confinement of the Bloch waves.

Multi-dimensional cases
The Schrödinger equation with a multi-dimensional periodic potential is a partial differential equation; the mathematics is more difficult. However, many fundamental understandings can also be obtained.

In many essential and straightforward cases, quantum confinement 
of multi-dimensional Bloch waves in one specific direction  
could produce two types of states. Each bulk energy band leads to
 states whose energy and properties depend on  but not 
and one state whose energy and properties depend on  but not . 
The -dependent states are stationary Bloch states. The energy of the -dependent state 
is always above the relevant -dependent stationary Bloch states.

Again, the very existence of such -dependent states is a fundamental distinction of the quantum confinement of multi-dimensional Bloch waves.

For example, in some simplest cases in a simple box of a rectangular cuboid shape having  periods separately in three
perpendicular dimensions, for each bulk energy band, there are   bulk-like states, 
()     
surface-like states,
()      
edge-like states and one vertex-like state.

The properties and energy of the vertex-like state depend on three , but neither one ;
The properties and energy of each edge-like state depend on two  and the other , but neither one of the corresponding two  nor the other ;
The properties and energy of each surface-like state depend on two  and the other , but neither one of the corresponding two  nor the other ;
The properties and energy of each bulk-like state depend on three , but neither one  .
 
Among the above states from the same bulk energy band, the following general relations exist:

The energy of the vertex-like state >
The energy of every edge-like state > 
The energy of every relevant surface-like state >
The energy of every relevant bulk-like state.

Those general relations lead to some conclusions that differ from those traditionally believed for physics in low-dimensional systems (see Bloch's theorem).

Relativistic effects 

The probability density does not go to zero at the nodes if relativistic effects are taken to account via Dirac equation.

See also
 History of Quantum Mechanics
 Finite potential well
 Delta function potential
 Gas in a box
 Particle in a ring
 Particle in a spherically symmetric potential
 Quantum harmonic oscillator
 Semicircle potential well
 Configuration integral (statistical mechanics)
 Bloch's theorem

References

Bibliography

External links

 Configuration integral (statistical mechanics), 2008. this wiki site is down; see this article in the web archive on 2012 April 28.

Quantum models
Quantum mechanical potentials